The North American Hockey League (NAHL) is one of the top junior hockey leagues in the United States and is in its 48th season of operation in 2022–23. It is the only Tier II junior league sanctioned by USA Hockey, and acts as an alternative for those who would not or did not make the roster of a team in the Major Junior Canadian Hockey League (CHL) nor Tier I United States Hockey League (USHL). The NAHL is one of the oldest junior hockey leagues in the United States and is headquartered in Addison, Texas.

The teams span the United States from Maine in the East to Alaska in the Northwest and to Texas in the South. The teams play a 60-game regular season, starting in mid-September and ending in early April. The top teams of the NAHL playoffs meet in a predetermined location to play in the Robertson Cup Championship Tournament.

Under USA Hockey Tier II sanctioning, NAHL teams do not charge players to play and also provide players with uniforms, team clothing and select equipment such as sticks, gloves and helmets. Players without local family live with billet families in their area and pay a monthly stipend that covers food and other costs. Unlike the Tier I United States Hockey League, there are no roster restrictions in the NAHL on overage players, which allows for the older players to gain extra NCAA exposure as well as teams to retain a veteran core. Teams are still bound to USA Hockey rules regarding import players, and presently each team is allowed to have four non-American players on their roster. Import players may also apply for an exemption from being counted as an import, but only if they have played hockey in the United States for four years prior.

From its beginning in 1975, the NAHL was primarily a 6–12-team league based in the Midwest, known as the Great Lakes Junior Hockey League and changed the name to the North American Hockey League in 1984. The league's all-time leading scorer is Ryan Fultz who tallied 246 points in four seasons. Other notable alumni from the NAHL include Pat LaFontaine, Mike Modano, Doug Weight, Pat Peake, Brian Rolston, Brian Holzinger, Brian Rafalski, Todd Marchant, John Scott, Connor Hellebuyck, and George Parros. In 2003, the league merged with the now defunct America West Hockey League to form a 19-team league.

Teams

Current teams
The 2021–22 season has 29 teams playing in four divisions:

Note: An asterisk (*) denotes a franchise relocation. See respective team articles from more information.

Future and dormant teams

Past teams

Alaska Avalanche (Wasilla, Alaska, for 2006–2010; Palmer, Alaska, for 2010–2012; relocated to Johnstown, Pennsylvania, and renamed Johnstown Tomahawks)
Albert Lea Thunder (Albert Lea, Minnesota; 2008–2010; relocated to Amarillo, Texas, and renamed Amarillo Bulls)
Amarillo Bulls (Amarillo, Texas; 2010–2021; relocated to Mason City, Iowa, as the North Iowa Bulls)
Aston Rebels (Aston, Pennsylvania; 2015–2017; was relocated and renamed to Philadelphia Rebels)
Alexandria Blizzard (Alexandria, Minnesota; 2006–2012; relocated to Brookings, South Dakota, and renamed Brookings Blizzard)
Alpena IceDiggers (Alpena, Michigan; 2005–2010; relocated to Corpus Christi, Texas, and renamed Corpus Christi IceRays)
Billings Bulls (Billings, Montana; 2003–2006; joined the NorPac)
Bloomfield Jets (Bloomfield, Michigan; 1987–90; relocated to Lakeland, Michigan, and renamed Lakeland Jets)
Bozeman Icedogs (Bozeman, Montana; 2003–2006; joined the NorPac)
Brookings Blizzard (Brookings, South Dakota; 2012–2019; relocated to St. Cloud, Minnesota as the St. Cloud Blizzard)
Buffalo Jr. Sabres (Buffalo, New York; 1983–1986; later members of the OJHL)
C & H Piping (Melvindale, Michigan; 1988–89; renamed Melvindale Blades)
Capital Centre Pride (Lansing, Michigan; 2000–03)
Central Texas Blackhawks (Belton, Texas; 2003–2005; renamed Central Texas Marshals for the 2004–05 season before ceasing operations at the end of the season)
Chicago Cougars (Chicago, Illinois; 1986–87; folded midseason)
Chicago Freeze (Chicago, Illinois; 1997–2003; folded due to "increased operation costs and low attendance")
Chicago Hitmen (Chicago, Illinois; 2010–2012; announced it would not play the 2012–13 season on May 11, 2012)
Chicago Patriots (Chicago, Illinois; 1986–87; folded midseason)
Chicago Young Americans (Chicago, Illinois; 1987–1989)
Cleveland Barons (Cleveland, Ohio; 1976–1979; withdrew from the league prior to the 1979–80 GLJHL season)
Coulee Region Chill (La Crosse, Wisconsin; 2010–2018; sold and relocated to Chippewa Falls, Wisconsin, as the Chippewa Steel)
Cleveland Jr. Barons (Parma, Ohio; 1993–2006; relocated to Columbus, Ohio, renamed Ohio Junior Blue Jackets and joined the USHL)
Danville Wings (Danville, Illinois, 1994–2003; joined the USHL)
Dawson Creek Rage (Dawson Creek, British Columbia; 2010–2012; ceased operations after 2011–12 season; franchise sold to Wilkes-Barre/Scranton Knights in 2015)
Dayton Gems (Dayton, Ohio; 2003–04; dissolved after 21 games, roster dispersed amongst remaining teams)
Dearborn Heights Nationals (Dearborn Heights, Michigan; 1994–1996; formerly Michigan Nationals; relocated to St. Louis, Missouri and renamed St. Louis Sting)
Dearborn Magic (Dearborn, Michigan; 1990–91; renamed Michigan Nationals)
Detroit Compuware/Compuware Ambassadors (Detroit, Michigan; 1984–2003)
Detroit Falcons (Fraser, Michigan; 1986–87; formerly St. Clair Shores Falcons)
Detroit Freeze (Fraser, Michigan; 1992–1997; moved to Chicago and renamed the Chicago Freeze)
Detroit Junior Wings (Detroit, Michigan; 1975–1983 GLJHL, 1987–1992 NAHL; Junior Red Wings moved to the OHL; replaced by the Detroit Freeze)
Detroit Little Caesars (Detroit, Michigan; 1975–76; only played in the inaugural season of the GLJHL)
Fargo-Moorhead Jets (Fargo, North Dakota; 2003–2008)
Fernie Ghostriders (Fernie, British Columbia; 2003–04; franchise rights were sold to a Kalamazoo, Michigan based group in 2003; joined the KIJHL)
Fraser Flags (Fraser, Michigan; 1981–1984)
Fraser Highlanders (Fraser, Michigan; 1976–1980)
Fresno Monsters (Fresno, California; 2010–2013; relocated to Wenatchee, Washington, and renamed Wenatchee Wild)
Gaylord Grizzles (Gaylord, Michigan; 1995–1998; formerly Saginaw Gears until relocating in December 1995; relocated to Grand Rapids, Michigan, and renamed Grand Rapids Bearcats)
Grand Rapids Bearcats (Grand Rapids, Michigan; 1998–2000; renamed Rockets during the 1999–2000 season when the league took over the franchise; relocated to Lansing and renamed Capital Centre Pride)
Helena Bighorns (Helena, Montana; 2003–2006; joined the NorPac)
Hennessey Engineers (Plymouth, Michigan; 1985–1987)
Indianapolis Junior Ice (Indianapolis, Indiana; 1989–1995)
Jamestown Ironmen (Jamestown, New York; 2011–2013; ceased operations after 2012–13 season due to ownership issues)
Kalamazoo Jr. Wings (Kalamazoo, Michigan; 1989–1994; relocated to Danville, Illinois, and renamed Danville Wings)
Kalamazoo Jr. K-Wings (Kalamazoo, Michigan; 2011–2013; ceased operations after 2012–13 season)
Keystone Ice Miners (Connellsville, Pennsylvania; 2014–15; ceased operations after one season in Pennsylvania)
Lakeland Jets (Lakeland, Michigan; 1990–1995; relocated to Sault Ste. Marie, Michigan, and renamed Soo Indians)
Lone Star Cavalry (North Richland Hills, Texas; 2003–04; relocated to Santa Fe, New Mexico, and renamed Santa Fe RoadRunners)
Lytes Rustlers (1990–91; Traveling team composed of west coast prospects played for one season)
Mahoning Valley Phantoms (Boardman, Ohio; 2005–2009; relocated to Youngstown, Ohio, moved to the USHL, and renamed Youngstown Phantoms)
Marquette Rangers (Marquette, Michigan; 2006–2010; relocated to Flint, Michigan, and renamed Michigan Warriors)
Melvindale Blades (Melvindale, Michigan; 1989–90)
Melvindale Lakers (Melvindale, Michigan; 1982–83)
Michigan Nationals (Dearborn, Michigan; 1991–1994; renamed Dearborn Heights Nationals)
Michigan Warriors (Flint, Michigan; 2010–2015; suspended operations after being displaced by the OHL's Flint Firebirds)
Minnesota Blizzard (Alexandria, Minnesota; 2003–2006; renamed Alexandria Blizzard)
Motor City Machine (Detroit, Michigan; 2008–09; renamed Motor City Metal Jackets)
Motor City Metal Jackets (Detroit, Michigan, 2009–2011; relocated to Jamestown, New York, renamed Jamestown Ironmen).
New Mexico Mustangs (Rio Rancho, New Mexico; 2010–2012: purchased and relocated to Richfield, Minnesota, after a one-year hiatus and renamed Minnesota Magicians)
Niagara Scenic (West Seneca, New York; 1987–1994)
North Iowa Outlaws (Mason City, Iowa; 2005–2010; relocated to Onalaska, Wisconsin, and renamed Coulee Region Chill)
Oakland Chiefs (Oakland, Michigan; 1975–76; relocated to Wayne, Michigan, and renamed Wayne Chiefs)
Owatonna Express (Owatonna, Minnesota; 2008–2011; relocated to Odessa, Texas, and renamed Odessa Jackalopes)
Paddock Pool Saints (Ecorse, Michigan; 1975–1984; won seven straight GLJHL titles)
Philadelphia Rebels (Philadelphia Pennsylvania; 2017–18; relocated from Aston for one season before relocating to Jamestown, New York, as the Jamestown Rebels)
Pittsburgh Forge (Pittsburgh, Pennsylvania; 2001–2003; relocated to Toledo, Ohio, and renamed Toledo IceDiggers)
Port Huron Fighting Falcons (Port Huron, Michigan; 2010–2014; relocated to Connellsville, Pennsylvania, and renamed Keystone Ice Miners)
Port Huron Fogcutters (Port Huron, Michigan; 1975–76)
Redford Royals (Redford, Michigan; 1978–1984, 1987–1989)
Rio Grande Valley Killer Bees (Hidalgo, Texas; 2013–2015; relocated to Aston, Pennsylvania, and renamed the Aston Rebels)
Rochester Junior Americans (Rochester, New York; 1999–2000)
Saginaw Gears (Saginaw, Michigan; 1991–1995; relocated in midseason to Gaylord, Michigan, and renamed Gaylord Grizzles)
Santa Fe RoadRunners (Santa Fe, New Mexico; 2004–2007; relocated to Topeka, Kansas, and renamed Topeka RoadRunners)
Soo Eagles (Sault Ste. Marie, Michigan; 2012–2015; returned to NOJHL and franchise relocated to Middletown, New Jersey, and renamed the New Jersey Titans)
Soo Indians (Sault Ste. Marie, Michigan; 1995–2005)
Southern Minnesota Express (Owatonna, Minnesota; 2005–2008; relocated to Detroit area and renamed Motor City Machine)
Springfield Spirit (Springfield, Missouri; 2001–2005; relocated to Wasilla, Alaska, and renamed Wasilla Spirit)
St. Clair Shores Falcons (St. Clair Shores, Michigan; 1983–1986; relocated to Fraser, Michigan, and renamed Detroit Falcons for one season)
St. Louis Bandits (St. Louis, Missouri; 2006–2012; purchased and relocated to Cloquet, Minnesota, after a one-year hiatus and to be used by the Minnesota Wilderness)
St. Louis Sting (St. Louis, Missouri; 1996–2001; relocated to Springfield, Missouri, and renamed Springfield Spirit)
Texarkana Bandits (Texarkana, Arkansas; 2003–2006; relocated to St. Louis, Missouri, and renamed St. Louis Bandits)
Texas Tornado (North Richland Hills, Texas for 1999–2008; hiatus for 2008–09 season; Frisco, Texas for 2009–13; relocated to back North Richland Hills in 2013 and renamed Lone Star Brahmas)
Toledo IceDiggers (Toledo, Ohio; 2003–2005; relocated to Alpena, Michigan, and renamed Alpena IceDiggers)
Topeka Pilots (Topeka, Kansas; 2018–2020; relocated to the Kansas City metropolitan area as the Kansas City Scouts, but never played before being relocating again as the Amarillo Wranglers)
Topeka RoadRunners (Topeka, Kansas; 2007–2018; renamed Topeka Pilots under new ownership)
Traverse City North Stars (Traverse City, Michigan; 2005–2012; franchise purchased and relocated to be used by the Soo Eagles)
USA Hockey National Team Development Program (Ann Arbor, Michigan; 1996–2009; moved to USHL)
Wasilla Spirit (Wasilla, Alaska; 2005–06; renamed Alaska Avalanche)
Waterford Lakers (Waterford, Michigan; 1981–82)
Wayne Chiefs (Wayne, Michigan; 1976–1980)
Wenatchee Wild (Wenatchee, Washington; 2008–2013; relocated to Hidalgo, Texas, and renamed Rio Grande Valley Killer Bees; Wild returned with the Fresno membership)
Wenatchee Wild (Wenatchee, Washington; 2013–2015; former Fresno franchise; joined the BCHL following the 2014–15 season)
Western Michigan Wolves (Kalamazoo, Michigan; 1988–89; renamed Kalamazoo Jr. Wings)
Wichita Falls Rustlers (Wichita Falls, Texas; 2003–04; renamed Wichita Falls Wildcats)
Wichita Falls Wildcats (Wichita Falls, Texas; 2004–2017; folded)
Wilkes-Barre/Scranton Knights (Pittston, Pennsylvania; 2015–2020; sold and relocated as Danbury Jr. Hat Tricks)
Youngstown Phantoms (Boardman, Ohio; 2003–2005; renamed Mahoning Valley Phantoms when the Central Hockey League's Youngstown SteelHounds began play in 2005)

Timeline of league changes
2006–07 season: Bozeman Icedogs, Billings Bulls, and Helena Bighorns left the league for the Northern Pacific Hockey League. Cleveland Jr. Barons were granted inactive status for the season.  Wasilla Spirit changed names to Alaska Avalanche.  Minnesota Blizzard became the Alexandria Blizzard.  Texarkana Bandits moved to Chesterfield, Missouri, and became the St. Louis Bandits.  Marquette Rangers were added to the league.

2007–08 season: Santa Fe Roadrunners moved to Topeka, Kansas, as the Topeka Roadrunners.  The Kenai River Brown Bears started play in the league.

2008–09 season: The Southern Minnesota Express moved to Detroit and became the Motor City Machine.  However, the Express' home city of Owatonna was granted another NAHL team for 2008–09, named the Owatonna Express.  The Express were joined by another new Minnesota NAHL franchise, the Albert Lea Thunder. The Texas Tornado franchise went on a one-year hiatus as they awaited renovations on their arena.  Wenatchee, Washington, was awarded an expansion franchise for the 2008–09 season as the Wenatchee Wild.  The Fargo-Moorhead Jets were approved for dormancy.

2009–10 season: The Janesville Jets were awarded an expansion franchise.  The Mahoning Valley Phantoms and the USNTDP left the league for the USHL.  The Texas Tornado returned to the league after taking a year off while their home arena was undergoing renovations.  The Motor City franchise's new ownership changed the team's nickname from Machine to Metal Jackets.

2010–11 season: The NAHL Board of Governors accepted membership of several new teams in the league. The Fresno Monsters were awarded an expansion franchise. after having a team in the Tier III Junior A Western States Hockey League. The Corpus Christi IceRays were awarded a franchise formerly known as the Alpena IceDiggers. The Chicago Hitmen joined the North Division and played at West Meadows Ice Arena in Rolling Meadows, Illinois. The Marquette Rangers moved to Flint, Michigan, and changed their name to Michigan Warriors. Port Huron joined the North Division and played at McMorran Place in Port Huron, Michigan. The North Iowa Outlaws relocated to become the Coulee Region Chill in Onalaska, Wisconsin. The Aberdeen Wings joined the Central Division and played at the Odde Ice Center in Aberdeen, South Dakota. The Austin Bruins joined the Central Division and played at the Riverside Arena in Austin, Minnesota. The Dawson Creek Rage joined the West Division and played at EnCana Events Centre in Dawson Creek, British Columbia. The Albert Lea Thunder relocate to become the Amarillo Bulls at joined the South Division out of the Amarillo Civic Center in Amarillo, Texas. The New Mexico Mustangs joined the South Division and played at Santa Ana Star Center in Rio Rancho, New Mexico. The Alaska Avalanche relocate to Palmer, Alaska, but keep the same name.

2011–12 season: The Owatonna Express relocate to Odessa, Texas, and become Odessa Jackalopes. The Motor City Metal Jackets relocate to Jamestown, New York, and become Jamestown Ironmen. The Minot Minotauros and Kalamazoo Jr. K-Wings granted expansion.

2012–13 season: The Alaska Avalanche relocated to Johnstown, Pennsylvania, and became Johnstown Tomahawks. Alexandria Blizzard relocated to Brookings, South Dakota, and became the Brookings Blizzard. Traverse City North Stars franchise purchased by the Soo Eagles and joined the league from Northern Ontario Junior Hockey League. The Dawson Creek Rage, New Mexico Mustangs, and St. Louis Bandits takes leaves of absence. The Chicago Hitmen fold.

2013–14 season: The dormant New Mexico Mustangs relocated to Richfield, Minnesota, and became Minnesota Magicians. The Texas Tornado relocated back to North Richland Hills, Texas, and became Lone Star Brahmas. The Minnesota Wilderness joined the league from the Superior International Junior Hockey League by purchasing dormant St. Louis Bandits franchise. The Rio Grande Valley Killer Bees purchased the Wenatchee Wild franchise. The Fresno Monsters were relocated to become the second incarnation of the Wenatchee Wild and the Monsters returned to only fielding a team in the Western States Hockey League. The Jamestown Ironmen and Kalamazoo Jr. K-Wings ceased operations.

2014–15 season: The Port Huron Fighting Falcons were relocated to Connellsville, Pennsylvania, to become the Keystone Ice Miners, remaining in the North Division, and the Wenatchee Wild moved from the Midwest Division to the South Division.

2015–16 season: On May 1, 2015, the NAHL announced that the dormant Dawson Creek Rage franchise was purchased by the Wilkes-Barre/Scranton Knights organization to be an expansion team for the 2015–16 season. The Keystone Ice Miners ceased operations. The Michigan Warriors ceased operations due to the arrival of the major junior Flint Firebirds. The Soo Eagles announced they were returning to the Northern Ontario Junior Hockey League citing the lack of other local teams as they were the last remaining team in Michigan. The New Jersey Junior Titans organization bought the franchise from the Eagles and relocated to Middleton, New Jersey. The Eagles originally sought membership with the NAHL for the 2012–13 season and returned to the NOJHL for the season 2015–16 season. The Rio Grande Valley Killer Bees were relocated to Aston, Pennsylvania and became the Aston Rebels. A new East Division was formed composed of Aston, Johnstown, New Jersey, and Wilkes-Barre/Scranton. The Wenatchee Wild organization left the NAHL and joined the Canadian Junior A British Columbia Hockey League.

2016–17 season: The league announced the continued expansion of the East Division by adding the Northeast Generals of Attleboro, Massachusetts. The Generals organization also has a Tier III team in the North American 3 Hockey League (previously in the North American 3 Eastern Hockey League prior to the 2016 league merger). On April 8, 2016, the Shreveport Mudbugs were announced as an expansion team.

2017–18 season: The Wichita Falls Wildcats ceased operations after failing to find a buyer for the franchise. Aston Rebels relocated and renamed as the Philadelphia Rebels.

2018–19 season: The NAHL added another team to its East Division with an expansion franchise granted to the Maryland Black Bears. The Coulee Region Chill were sold and relocated as the Chippewa Steel in Chippewa Falls, Wisconsin, and the Philadelphia Rebels became the Jamestown Rebels in Jamestown, New York. The Topeka RoadRunners were sold and rebranded as the Topeka Pilots.

2019–20 season: The NAHL approved of two expansion teams: the Maine Nordiques in Lewiston, Maine, and the New Mexico Ice Wolves in Albuquerque, New Mexico. The Brookings Blizzard relocated and became the St. Cloud Blizzard.

2020–21 season: The NAHL added the Wichita Falls Warriors as an expansion team while the Topeka Pilots were relocated as the Kansas City Scouts and the Wilkes-Barre/Scranton Knights sold their franchise to the Danbury Jr. Hat Tricks. The St. Cloud Blizzard rebranded as the St. Cloud Norsemen. The Corpus Christi IceRays, Jamestown Rebels, Kansas City Scouts, and Springfield Jr. Blues went dormant for the season due to the on-going COVID-19 pandemic. The Fairbanks Ice Dogs and Kenai River Brown Bears both temporarily relocated to Minnesota and closer to the other teams in their division until mid-April 2021 due to pandemic-related travel restrictions to Alaska.

2021–22 season: The Amarillo Bulls were relocated to Mason City, Iowa, as the North Iowa Bulls. The Kansas City Scouts were originally granted another season of dormancy, but were instead sold and relocated to Amarillo as the Amarillo Wranglers to begin play for the 2021–22 season. Corpus Christi, Jamestown, and Springfield returned after a one-season pandemic-related hiaturs. The league added a third team in Alaska called the Anchorage Wolverines.

2022-23 Season: The Minnesota Magicians were purchased and relocated to Eagle River, Wisconsin as the Wisconsin Windigo. The NAHL approved the relocation of the Wichita Falls Warriors to Oklahoma City, Oklahoma to become the Oklahoma Warriors.

2023-24 Season: NAHL approved a new team in the East Division to be located in Rochester, New York that will be known as the "Rochester Junior Americans" ("Jr. Amerks"), a nod to Rochester's American Hockey League (AHL) team, the Rochester Americans ("Amerks"), a minor league affiliate of the Buffalo Sabres. The team is co-owned by Wegmans CEO Coleen Wegman and Chris O'Donnell. Former Amerks, AHL and NHL players and coaches, including Brian Gionta, Nathan Paetsch, Stephen Gionta, David Leggio, will be affiliated with the new team. The team will play at the Rochester Ice Center in the metropolitan suburb of Fairport, New York. The NAHL added another team to the East Division later in 2022-23 season, as the New Hampshire Mountain Kings were approved for their membership, making it the first time an NAHL team was located in New Hampshire. The team will be based out of the renovated Tri-Town Ice Arena in Hooksett, New Hampshire.

Robertson Cup winners 
The Robertson Cup Championship is a playoff series held at the end of the NAHL season. The trophy is awarded annually to the USA Hockey Tier II junior national playoff champion. The Cup is the oldest junior hockey trophy in the United States and is named in honor of Chuck Robertson, a pioneer of junior hockey in the NAHL and youth hockey in the state of Michigan. Chuck Robertson was the owner of the Paddock Pool Saints when they won a record seven straight NAHL championships from 1976 to 1983.

As of the 2021–22 season

References

External links
 North American Hockey League

 
2